Lukáš Zoubele (born 20 December 1985) is a Czech football midfielder currently playing for FC Vysočina Jihlava.

Career
Zoubele began playing football for FK Teplice's youth side. He went on loans to FK Ústí nad Labem and SK Kladno in order to get regular playing time before returning to Teplice in 2010.

References

External links
 Profile at iDNES.cz
 Profile at fczbrno.cz

1985 births
Living people
Czech footballers
Czech First League players
FK Teplice players
SK Kladno players
FK Jablonec players
FC Zbrojovka Brno players
Association football midfielders
FC Vysočina Jihlava players
Sportspeople from Ústí nad Labem
FK Ústí nad Labem players
Czech National Football League players